Quartermain Point is a prominent point in the north part of Moubray Bay between Helm Point and Cape Roget. It was named by the New Zealand Geological Survey Antarctic Expedition (NZGSAE), 1957–58, for L.B. Quartermain, president, New Zealand Antarctic Society, who took a close interest in the work of the expedition.

Headlands of Victoria Land
Borchgrevink Coast